The Baden Hills are four glacier-made kames near the community of Baden in the Township of Wilmot, Ontario, Canada. They can be seen from practically anywhere in Wilmot Township.

History
A large village was present on the side of the Baden Hills during the Late Woodland period.

References

Landforms of the Regional Municipality of Waterloo
Kames